Jiří Skalák (born 12 March 1992) is a Czech professional footballer who plays as a winger for Czech First League side Mladá Boleslav. He has represented the Czech Republic internationally at youth levels U16 through U21.

Club career

Early career
Skalák started his professional career at AC Sparta Prague, spending time on loan at MFK Ružomberok, 1. FC Slovácko, FC Zbrojovka Brno and FK Mladá Boleslav before moving to Mladá Boleslav permanently in 2015.

Brighton & Hove Albion
Skalák joined Football League Championship side Brighton & Hove Albion on 1 February 2016 for an undisclosed fee, believed to be £1.2 million. He scored his first goal for the club in a 4–0 win over QPR on 19 April 2016.

Millwall
On 2 August 2018, Skalák joined Championship side Millwall for an undisclosed fee.

Mladá Boleslav
On 8 February 2021, Skalák joined Czech First League side FK Mladá Boleslav for an undisclosed fee.

International career
Skalák represented his country on all youth levels from under-16 to under-21. He was called up for the senior national team for the first time on 25 August 2015 to face Latvia and Kazakhstan in the UEFA Euro 2016 qualifying round but did not play in those matches.

Career statistics

Honors
Czech Republic U19 
UEFA European Under-19 Championship runner-up 2011

References

External links
Jiří Skalák, FAČR

1992 births
Living people
Sportspeople from Pardubice
Czech footballers
Czech Republic youth international footballers
Czech Republic under-21 international footballers
Czech expatriate footballers
Association football forwards
Association football wingers
AC Sparta Prague players
MFK Ružomberok players
1. FC Slovácko players
FC Zbrojovka Brno players
FK Mladá Boleslav players
Brighton & Hove Albion F.C. players
Millwall F.C. players
Czech National Football League players
Czech First League players
Slovak Super Liga players
English Football League players
UEFA Euro 2016 players
Czech expatriate sportspeople in England
Expatriate footballers in England
Expatriate footballers in Slovakia
Czech expatriate sportspeople in Slovakia